Campylospermum scheffleri is a species of plant in the family Ochnaceae. It is endemic to Tanzania.

References

scheffleri
Flora of Tanzania
Vulnerable plants
Taxonomy articles created by Polbot